An Act of Conscience is a 1997 documentary film by Robbie Leppzer about the war tax resistance of Randy Kehler and Betsy Corner and years-long struggle that ensued after the IRS seized their home in Colrain, Massachusetts in 1989, to recover $27,000 in unpaid taxes, penalties, and interest. The film premiered at Sundance Film Festival and was shown on Cinemax and the Sundance Channel. It is narrated by Martin Sheen and features cameo appearances by activist-priest Daniel Berrigan and political folksinger Pete Seeger.

Plot
After the house was seized, the couple and their daughter refuse to move out and Kehler is arrested on December 3, 1991, by US Marshals and IRS agents. Community supporters move in, helping them to occupy the house. On February 12, 1992, the still-occupied house—but not the land, which belongs to the Valley Community Land Trust—is sold at auction to Danny Franklin and Terry Charnesky for $5400; the IRS had failed to receive any monetary bids at an earlier auction. The sale results in suits and countersuits between the Franklin-Charnesky family and the Land Trust. Despite the sale of the house, the Kehler-Corner occupiers refuse to leave.

However, on April 15, 1992, while Kehler, Corner, and their supporters are away, Franklin, Charnesky, and their supporters move-in and occupy the house. Kehler, Corner, and their supporters begin a lively protest and round-the-clock vigil just outside the house, eventually even building a small wooden structure to shelter the protesters. On May 28, 1993, the Franklin County Superior court issues an injunction against the Kehler-Corner protests and, subsequently, several protesters are arrested and jailed after violating the injunction. Still, the protest continues until September, when they are finally discontinued. The battle over the house is ended on December 31, 1993, when an out-of-court settlement is reached between the Land Trust and the Franklin-Charnesky family, who agree to leave the house and deed it and the land-lease to the land trust in exchange for an undisclosed sum of money.

References

External links
 
"The Great Anti-War Films: An Act of Conscience." A review by Rick Gee at lewrockwell.com.
Film description and director profile at the Human Rights Watch film festival site.
Description of personal, legal, and media papers about the "Colrain Action," archived in the Special Collections and University Archives, W.E.B. Du Bois Library, University of Massachusetts Amherst.
"Conscience, Community, and Compromise" by Randy Kehler in Sojourners, April, 1994, (free registration required).

1997 films
American documentary films
Tax resistance in the United States
Civil disobedience
Works about community organizing
Anti-war protests
1997 documentary films
Documentary films about American politics
Films shot in Massachusetts
Films about activists
1990s English-language films
1990s American films